Warbleton is a village and civil parish in the Wealden district of East Sussex, England. Within its bounds are three other settlements. It is located south-east of Heathfield on the slopes of the Weald.

Etymology
The place-name Warbleton, derived from the Old English Wǣrburhe tūn, means the farmstead or village of a woman called Wǣrburh. In the Domesday Book (1086) the name is recorded as 'Warborgetone'. It is subsequently recorded as Warberton (1166), Walberton (1340), and Warbleton (1404). Wǣrburh is said to be one of the half-dozen or so women who owned property in the land of the South Saxons.

History
The manor of Warbleton was held by the Levett family of Sussex for several centuries. The same family held Salehurst, and had earlier held Firle, Catsfield, Hollington and other manors across Sussex. The family is of Anglo-Norman descent, and members of the family were vicars, ironmasters, and landowners. The Levetts of Salehurst, Warbleton and Fittleworth owned Bodiam Castle and sold it to Nicholas Tufton, 1st Earl of Thanet. Some of the Levett family's property was forfeited due to the bankruptcy of an early heir, and other lands were carried by marriage into other prominent Sussex and Kent families. Brian Epstein, manager of the Beatles, once owned a house in the parish named Kingsley Hill.

Governance

The parish council consists of eleven members.

Geography
The parish consists of two villages, Rushlake Green and Bodle Street Green; and two hamlets, Warbleton and Three Cups. They lie in an area of the Weald between the A267 road between Hailsham and Heathfield to the west and the B2096 Hailsham to Battle road to the north.

Principal buildings
There are two churches in the civil parish, St Mary the Virgin at Warbleton; and St John the Evangelist at Bodle Street Green. The two form a united benefice under one vicar. Chapel services are held at Three Cups. Warbleton has a village hall; and a second, Dunn Village Hall, is at Rushlake Green.

References

 
Villages in East Sussex
Civil parishes in East Sussex
Wealden District